HMS Mallard was a two funnel, 30-knot destroyer ordered by the Royal Navy under the 1894 – 1895 Naval Estimates.  She served in Home waters both before and during the First World War, and was sold for breaking in 1920.

Construction
She was laid down as yard number 308 on 15 September 1895 at the John I. Thornycroft & Company shipyard at Chiswick on the River Thames. She was launched on 19 November 1896.  During her builder's trials her maximum average speed was 30.1 knots. She had her armament fitted at Portsmouth, was completed and was accepted by the Royal Navy in October 1897.

Pre-War
After commissioning she was assigned to the Chatham Division of the Harwich Flotilla.

Lieutenant Guy de Lancy Ormsby Johnson was appointed in command on 11 January 1900, when she served as part of the Medway instructional flotilla.

Lieutenant Charles Tuthill Borrett was appointed in command on 20 January 1901, and she served in Home waters and was until October 1901 attached to the Medway instructional flotilla. In early April 1902 Lieutenant George J. Todd was appointed in command, shortly before she finished a refit where she also had her hull strengthened. She was commissioned for service in the Mediterranean Fleet, and left Portsmouth for Gibraltar in late May 1902, arriving at Malta in July. She was reported to visit Greek waters (including Nauplia) in September 1902.

On the night of 22 November 1910, Mallard collided with the destroyer , with both destroyers suffering damaged stems. The cruisers  and  went to the assistance of the two damaged destroyers, which were taken into Syracuse, Sicily for repair. On 30 August 1912 the Admiralty directed that all destroyer classes were to be designated by letters.  Since her design speed was 30-knots and she had two funnels she was assigned to the D class; the three and four-funnel 30-knotters becoming the C and B classes.  After 30 September 1913, she was known as a D-class destroyer and had the letter ‘D’ painted on the hull below the bridge area and on either the fore or aft funnel

First World War
In July 1914 she was in active commission assigned to the 8th Destroyer Flotilla based at Sheerness tendered to the destroyer depot ship .  In August 1914 the 8th was redeployed to the River Tyne and employed on anti-submarine and counter-mining patrols.

In November 1917 she deployed to the Irish Sea Hunting Flotilla until the cessation of hostilities providing anti-submarine and counter-smuggling patrols.

Fate
In 1919 she was paid off and laid-up in reserve awaiting disposal. Mallard was sold on 10 February 1920 to Alloa Ship Breaking Company for breaking at Charlestown.

Pennant numbers

References

Bibliography
 
 
 
 
 
 
 
 

 

Ships built in Chiswick
1896 ships
D-class destroyers (1913)
World War I destroyers of the United Kingdom
Ships built by John I. Thornycroft & Company